If I Ruled the World is a 1965 studio album by Sammy Davis Jr. The album was produced by Warner Brothers.

Track listing
"If I Ruled the World" (Leslie Bricusse, Cyril Ornadel) – 2:36
"Flash, Bang, Wallop!" (David Heneker) – 2:43
"Night Song" (Lee Adams, Charles Strouse) – 2:41
"Ten Out of Ten" (Bricusse) – 3:02
"Who Can I Turn To (When Nobody Needs Me)" (Bricusse, Anthony Newley) – 3:01
"There's a Party Going On" (Adams, Strouse) – 3:17
"Sit Down, You're Rockin' the Boat" (Frank Loesser) – 3:33
"Tracey" (Jule Styne) – 3:23
"Guys and Dolls" (Loesser) – 2:12
"Another Spring" (Robin Beaumont, Bricusse) – 2:41
"Yes I Can" (Adams, Strouse) – 2:15

Personnel 
Sammy Davis Jr. – vocals
Warren Barker – arrangement, conductor
Morris Stoloff
Marty Paich
Morty Stevens

References

1964 albums
Sammy Davis Jr. albums
Reprise Records albums
Albums arranged by Warren Barker
Albums conducted by Warren Barker